Proteasomal ATPase-associated factor 1 is an enzyme that in humans is encoded by the PAAF1 gene.

Interactions 

PAAF1 has been shown to interact with PSMD10.

References

Further reading